This is a list of episodes from the anime series Mobile Suit Gundam 00. The series premiered on October 6, 2007, replacing Toward the Terra on the terrestrial MBS and TBS networks, occupying the networks' noted Saturday 6:00 p.m. timeslot. The first season ended its run on March 29, 2008. Season one of the series has been re-broadcast across Japan on various television networks such as TBS, Kids Station, MBS and BS-i from April onwards. Season two is being broadcast in the MBS and TBS Sunday 5:00 p.m. slot since October 5, 2008. The second season ended its run on March 29, 2009. Season two of the series has been re-broadcast across Japan on various television networks such as TBS, Kids Station, MBS and BS-i from April onwards. The English dub of the first season premiered on Syfy (spelled Sci Fi at the time; renamed Syfy midway through the anime's run) on Monday November 24, 2008 at 11:00 p.m. ET/PT and ended on February 9, 2009. The English dub of the second season premiered on Syfy on Monday June 29, 2009 at 11:00 p.m. ET/PT and concluded on September 21, 2009.

The official DVDs of Mobile Suit Gundam 00 had been released with 7 volumes on January 25, February 22, March 25, April 25, May 23, June 25 and July 25 of 2008. Blu-ray DVDs of Mobile Suit Gundam 00 had been released so far with Volumes 1 and 2 on August 22, Volume 3 on September 22 and Volume 4 on October 24 of 2008.

The first opening theme song, "Daybreak's Bell" was performed by the band L'Arc~en~Ciel. Both songs were replaced in episode 14 with "Ash Like Snow", performed by The Brilliant Green, as the new opening and "Friends" by Stephanie as the new ending. The first opening song, "Daybreak's Bell" was also used as the ending theme to the last episode of its two seasons. "Love Today", performed by Taja, was used as an insert song in episode 19 and 24.
Unlimited Sky by Tommy Heavenly6 was used as an insert song in episode 18 of the second season. The first ending theme for the second season, "Prototype" is  performed by Chiaki Ishikawa. The second ending theme for the second season, "Trust You" is performed by Yuna Ito.

Episodes

First season

Second season

References
General
 
 
 

Specific

Mobile Suit Gundam 00
00
Episodes

zh:機動戰士GUNDAM 00#各集標題